Yutz (Lorraine Franconian: Jäiz) is a commune in the Moselle department in Grand Est in north-eastern France, close to the borders with both Luxembourg and Germany. It was created in 1971 by merging the former communes of Basse-Yutz and Haute-Yutz. Macquenom is also a part of the commune since 1810.

The town is located by the river Moselle where it borders with the city of Thionville. The famous Basse Yutz Flagons, considered by many to be the apogee of Celtic art, were found in the area. They now form part of the British Museum's collection.

The inhabitants are called Yussois.

Population

People born in the town 

 François Zimmer (1860 – ap. 1918), Lorraine political man, member of the Landtag of Alsace-Lorraine from 1911 to 1918, was born in Basse-Yutz July 8, 1860.
 Annelise Reichmann (1902–2000), German painter, born in Basse-Yutz January 3, 1902.
 Elisabeth Grümmer (1911–1986), opera singer, born in Basse-Yutz March 31, 1911.
 Paul-Joseph Schmitt (1911–1987), Bishop of Metz from 1958 to 1987, was born in Basse-Yutz March 31, 1911.
 Wilhelm Emrich (1909–1998), German literary critic, professor at the Free University of Berlin, publisher, born in Basse-Yutz November 29, 1909.
 Rolland Ehrhardt (1941–2007), French former professional footballer from 1956 to 1975 born in Haute-Yutz February 22, 1941.

Personalities linked to the town 

 Jean Mermoz, pilot based at the airfield Thionville – Basse-Yutz.
 Jean Rongoni, French footballer from 1954 to 1960, born in 1932 in Volmerange-les-Mines.
 Jean Vodaine, Franco-Slovenian worker-poet-writer-typographer and painter, winner of many international awards (1921–2006), born July 6, 1921 in Volče, Slovenia.

See also 
 Communes of the Moselle department
 Website of the Town Hall
 Website on the history of Yutz through its streets and shops

References

External links 
 

Communes of Moselle (department)